The South Carolina Conference is an annual conference (regional episcopal area, similar to a diocese) of the United Methodist Church. This conference serves the state of South Carolina with its administrative offices and the office of the bishop (currently L. Jonathan Holston) being in Columbia, South Carolina. It is part of the Southeastern Jurisdictional Conference.  

The South Carolina Conference provides funding to four institutions of higher learning: 
Spartanburg Methodist College   -- Spartanburg, South Carolina
Claflin University  --  Orangeburg, South Carolina
Columbia College  --  Columbia, South Carolina
Wofford College   --  Spartanburg, South Carolina

The SC Annual Conference is further subdivided into 12 smaller regions, called "districts," which provide further administrative functions for the operation of local churches in cooperation with each other. This structure is vital to Methodism, and is referred to as connectionalism. The Districts that comprise the South Carolina Conference are:

Anderson 
Charleston
Columbia 
Florence
Greenville
Greenwood 
Hartsville
Marion
Orangeburg
Rock Hill 
Spartanburg
Walterboro

References

External links
South Carolina Conference of The United Methodist Church
South Carolina United Methodist Advocate, conference newspaper

Methodism in South Carolina
South Carolina
South